The Pennsylvania Insurance Department is a cabinet-level agency in Pennsylvania, United States. It was founded in 1873 and has several main functions, including: 
 To audit insurance companies' finances
 Issue licenses to insurance industry individuals and companies
 Regulate insurance policies and rates

See also
 List of Pennsylvania state agencies

References

External links
 

State agencies of Pennsylvania
Government agencies established in 1873
1873 establishments in Pennsylvania